= MuchTV =

muchTV is a VOD offering in the Middle East and North Africa (MENA) region and Pakistan, launched by Chinese telecom company Huawei. The app offers a variety of content that include Hollywood movies, animated movies for kids and local Arabic content (Jazzwood). Bollywood, Urdu, Malayalam, Tamil, Telugu, Kannada, Tagalog and Persian-language movies will be available in the library as well

== Content Library ==
muchTV has licensed content from Hollywood studios and Indie productions. The beta version library has 4 categories – Hollywood, Kids, Arabic and Much More. The Much More category contains short clips related to beauty, celebrities, lifestyle and general information (facts and trivia).

== Subscription ==
muchTV is a SVOD service and its beta version released in July 2015 and is currently available free. The paid subscriptions will be introduced along with the next version release towards the end of the last quarter of 2015. The service is being promoted through local telecom operators in the MENA region.

Huawei's payment gateway product, epay, will be one of the modes of payment available for the monthly subscriptions. Credit cards and operator billing will be the other modes of payment that the user can use to access the library.

== Features ==
The app comes with parental control and is available on iOS and Android devices. muchTV can be used via WiFi as well as the 3G network. The content on muchTV has been licensed on a regional basis. muchTV also supports multi profile feature for use on additional devices.

== Developers ==
muchTV has been developed by the Middle East Hosting Division which is among 8 Huawei hosting centers worldwide. Huawei's InTouch Partnership Program which has over 2100 partners around the world is supported by these hosting centers.
